Black Rock Mountain is in the Blackstairs Mountains which are located on the Carlow-Wexford border. 

The Blackstairs are divided into two massifs, to the north Mount Leinster and to the south Blackstairs Mountain. Black Rock is the terminal peak of the eastern shoulder of Mount Leinster.

See also
List of mountains in Ireland

Mountains and hills of County Wexford